Barrierpepsin (barrier proteinase, Bar proteinase) is an enzyme. This enzyme catalyses the following chemical reaction

 Selective cleavage of -Leu6-Lys- bond in the pheromone alpha-mating factor

This endopeptidase is present in baker's yeast (Saccharomyces cerevisiae).

References

External links 
 

EC 3.4.23